The 2022 AFF U-19 Youth Championship was the 18th edition of the AFF U-19 Youth Championship, organised by ASEAN Football Federation. It was hosted by Indonesia during July 2022. The planned 2020 and 2021 AFF U-19 Youth Championship were cancelled due to COVID-19 pandemic.

Malaysia beat Laos 2–0 in the final for their second title in the championship.

Participant teams 
There was no qualification, and all entrants advanced to the final tournament, except for the defending champions Australia. The following teams from member associations of the AFF entered the tournament:

Venues

Group stage
 All times listed are WIB (UTC+7).

Group A

Group B

Knockout stage 
In the knockout stage, the penalty shoot-out was used to decide the winner if necessary.

Bracket

Semi-finals

Third place match

Final

Winner

Awards

Goalscorers

Final ranking
This table will show the ranking of teams throughout the tournament.

Controversies
The match between Cambodia and Laos in Group B was marked with a controversy. Cambodia's goal against Laos in the 76th minute had crossed the goal line, but Indonesian referee Aprisman Aranda did not award the goal for Cambodia. The result of the match ended with Laos' win over Cambodia with a score of 2-1.

The Football Federation of Cambodia (FFC) has officially lodged a protest with the AFF regarding this issue. Responding to Cambodia's protests, the AFF also sent a letter as an apology.

The final match of group A between Vietnam and Thailand was filled with controversy. As both teams only needed a draw with goals to advance to the semi-finals, regardless of Indonesia's win over Myanmar. The match ended with 1-1 draw, which was enough for Vietnam and Thailand to see them through to the semi-finals, and hosts Indonesia were eliminated despite having the same point and best productivity goals. This was based on the head-to-head criteria between the three teams, as per the AFF U-19 Championship 2022 Tournament Rules and Regulations.

With a score of 1-1 after 76 minutes, Vietnam and Thailand were considered not making a fair-play game. With both teams being considered slowing down the tempo of the game on purpose, after guaranteeing a spot into the semi-finals with the scores in the last 15 minutes. With the Vietnamese players only playing the ball around without being pressured by Thai players, while the Thai players were laying down with injuries despite not involving with the ball at all.

Indonesia national team coach Shin Tae-Yong criticized the AFF rules being outdated, “This tournament regulation is weird because the AFF is still using it, even though FIFA and AFC are no longer using it. So, for us being unable to qualify for the semifinals does not make sense”.

On 12 July 2022, Indonesian football governing body PSSI officially sent a letter of protest to the AFF over allegations of a match fixing between Vietnam and Thailand. With the AFF responding that there are no issues with it.

References 

AFF U-19 Youth Championship
AFF
AFF
2022 in Asian football
Association football controversies
Controversies in Indonesia